This article is about the particular significance of the year 1989 to Wales and its people.

Incumbents

Secretary of State for Wales – Peter Walker
Archbishop of Wales – George Noakes, Bishop of St David's
Archdruid of the National Eisteddfod of Wales – Emrys Deudraeth

Events
22 February – While out canvassing for the Conservative Party in the Pontypridd by-election campaign, MP Sir Raymond Gower is taken ill and dies, occasioning a by-election in his own seat of the Vale of Glamorgan.
23 February – In a parliamentary by-election at Pontypridd, caused by the death of Labour MP Brynmor John, Dr Kim Howells retains the seat for Labour.
27 February – Newport County A.F.C., bottom of the GM Vauxhall Conference (highest division outside the Football League in England), are declared bankrupt in the High Court with debts in the region of £330,000. The club was in the Football League for nearly 70 years until last year. 
5 April – Newport County lose a final appeal in the High Court against their winding-up order, and officially go out of business. They are expelled from the GM Vauxhall Conference for failing to fulfill their fixtures, having not played any scheduled matches for nearly two months. They are subsequently reformed and are expected to compete in the English lower leagues.
4 May – In the by-election for the Westminster Parliament brought about by the death of Sir Raymond Gower, John Smith wins the Vale of Glamorgan seat for the Labour Party after 38 years of Conservative control.
27 May – John Evans of Fforestfach becomes the UK's oldest man ever; Evans dies the following year, but the record stands until 2009.
20 June – The new Penmaenbach Tunnel opens on the A55 road.
26 August – Closure of Oakdale Colliery, the last mine in Gwent.
7 December – The body of an unidentified girl is found by workmen in a derelict house in Cardiff. The remains are eventually identified by forensic scientists as those of 15-year-old Karen Price, who had gone missing in 1981.
date unknown
The Open University begins offering a course in Welsh.
Newly qualified doctors are allowed to take the Hippocratic oath in Welsh for the first time.
The House of Lords ceremony for the swearing-in of a new QC is conducted in Welsh for the first time.
Wales' first purpose-built Sikh gurdwarah opens in Cardiff.
Val Feld becomes head of the Equal Opportunities Commission in Wales.
Scarweather lightvessel in Swansea Bay is replaced by a warning buoy.

Arts and literature
Roger Rees becomes an American citizen.

Awards
National Eisteddfod of Wales (held in Llanrwst)
National Eisteddfod of Wales: Chair – Idris Reynolds
National Eisteddfod of Wales: Crown – Selwyn Griffiths
National Eisteddfod of Wales: Prose Medal – Irma Chilton
Gwobr Goffa Daniel Owen -

New books

English language
Leo Abse – Margaret, Daughter of Beatrice
Catherine Fisher – Immrana
Ken Follett – The Pillars of the Earth
D. Tecwyn Lloyd – John Saunders Lewis
Christopher Meredith – Shifts
Jenny Nimmo – The Chestnut Soldier
Leslie Norris – The Girl from Cardigan
Nigel Wells – Wilderness/Just Balance

Welsh language
Geraint Bowen – John Morris-Jones: y diwygiwr iaith a llên
Tony Conran – Blodeuwedd
Hywel Teifi Edwards – Codi'r hen wlad yn ei hol, 1850-1914
Donald Evans – Iasau
Alan Llwyd – Yn y Dirfawr Wag
Prys Morgan – Beibl i Gymru
Rhydwen Williams – Liwsi Regina

Music
Classical
Malcolm Arnold - Four Welsh Dances, Op. 138
Alun Hoddinott – Star Children
Jeffrey Lewis – Silentia Noctis
Albums
Mary Hopkin – Spirit
Bonnie Tyler – Heaven & Hell (album) (with Meat Loaf)

Film
Christian Bale is lured back into films to appear in Kenneth Branagh's Henry V. Welsh actor David Lloyd Meredith is also among the cast.

Welsh-language films
Becca, filmed in English and Welsh in Australia.

Broadcasting

Welsh-language television
Steddfod, Steddfod, with Caryl Parry Jones

English-language television
The Great Little Trains of Wales
Nineteen 96, directed by Karl Francis, co-stars Keith Allen and Brinley Jenkins.

Sport
BBC Wales Sports Personality of the Year – Stephen Dodd
Golf – Stephen Dodd wins the British amateur championship.

Births
8 January – Non Stanford, triathlete
17 March – Morfydd Clark, actress (in Sweden)
25 March – Tom Maynard, cricketer (died 2012)
23 June – Darragh Mortell, actor
15 July – Gareth Bale, footballer
21 July – Chris Gunter, footballer
21 August – Jessica Allen, cyclist
24 October – Nathan Wyburn, artist
10 November – Taron Egerton, actor
18 December – David Anthony, wheelchair rugby player
30 December – Aaron Morris, footballer

Deaths
5 February – Emrys James, actor, 60
19 February – Jack Bassett, Wales international rugby union player, 83
22 February – Sir Raymond Gower, politician, 72
3 May
George Lowrie, footballer, 69
William Squire, actor, 73
25 June – Idris Cox, political activist, 89
July – Glen Moody, boxer, 80
17 September – Don Vines, wrestler, 57
5 October 
Elvet Jones, Wales and British Lions rugby international, 77
Dicky Ralph, rugby player, 81
20 October – Bill Tamplin, Wales rugby player and captain, 72
27 October – Frank Vining, potter, 75
7 November – Dai Astley, footballer, 80
December – Bill Harris, footballer, 61 (stroke)
4 December – Elwyn Jones, Baron Elwyn-Jones, former Lord Chancellor, 80
10 December – Harold Thomas, rugby player, 75
28 December – George Andrews, Wales dual-code rugby player, 85
30 December – Madoline Thomas, actress, 99
date unknown – Eynon Evans, writer and actor, 85

See also 
 1989 in Northern Ireland

References 

 
Wales